Paul Cernat (born August 5, 1972 in Bucharest) is a Romanian essayist and literary critic. He has a Ph.D. summa cum laude in philology. Cernat has been a member of the Writers' Union of Romania since 2009. As of 2013, he is lecturer of Romanian literature in the Department of History of the University of Bucharest.

References

Romanian essayists
1972 births
Academic staff of the University of Bucharest
Living people